Kelly Kozumi Shinozawa is a Japanese female manga artist.

Shinozawa was born in Toyota, Aichi, Japan. After studying Visual design at Nagoya Zokei Junior College of Art & Design, Nagoya, she started to published her Shōjo manga work in Shueisha's Ribon Original and Ribon magazines in 1990, using her pen name of Kozumi Shinozawa.

In 2002, Shinozawa moved to New York City, and studied Graphic design at Parsons School of Design, NYC. She was influenced by her roommate to embrace Christian faith, and was baptized at Japanese American United Church.

From 2008, Shinozawa changed her pen name to Kelly Shinozawa. Her best known work is Manga Messiah and Manga Metamorphosis of the Manga Bible Series, that have been translated into twenty one languages of the world.

References

External links
 Kelly's Farm: Kelly Kozumi Shinozawa's Official Site

Manga artists
Japanese Christians
Living people
Year of birth missing (living people)